Puerto Rico Highway 798 (PR-798) is a road located between the municipalities of Caguas, Puerto Rico, and San Juan, and it corresponds to an original segment of the historic Carretera Central. La Concepción Bridge is located on this route.

Major intersections

See also

 List of highways numbered 798

References

External links
 

798